Cauldron is a 2008 album by Ruins.

Track listing 
 "Where Time Is Left Behind (Echoes of Ghosts)" – 5:36
 "Threshold Forms" – 4:29
 "Cauldron" – 6:25
 "Hanged After Being Blinded" – 6:15
 "Genesis" – 7:04
 "Upon These Skeletons (Bury the Dead)" – 5:57
 "Suicidal Pulse" – 4:19

Ruins (Australian band) albums
2008 albums